The United States national rugby union team has played in all but one Rugby World Cup since the inaugural tournament in 1987.
The USA is the second strongest national rugby side in North America, and the third strongest in the Americas after Argentina and Canada.

The U.S. has played in seven World Cups from the inaugural 1987 tournament to the most recent one in 2019—all but the 1995 World Cup. The team's best result so far has been to win one game—which they accomplished in 1987, 2003, and 2011.

Summary of results by tournament

Summary of results by opponent

Notes:
 Results current through end of 2019 Rugby World Cup.
 The US has never played Wales or Canada in a RWC, even though those two teams have played in every RWC.
 Ivory Coast, Zimbabwe, Namibia, Georgia, Uruguay, Spain, and Portugal are the other seven nations that have yet to play the USA at the Rugby World Cup that have previously qualified.

Qualifying

The U.S. has qualified for every World Cup, except for the 1995 and 2023 tournaments.

Notes

Rugby World Cup hosting
So far the USA has not hosted any Rugby World Cup games, and no Rugby World Cups have been held in the Americas. The United States is, however, interested in pursuing a bid, possibly a joint bid with Canada, to host the 2027 Rugby World Cup.

Team RWC records
 Most points scored in a single tournament: 86 (2003)
 Most points scored in a single match: 39 (39–26 vs. Japan in 2003)
 Largest margin of victory: 13 (39–26 vs. Japan in 2003)

Player RWC records

Career

Updated: October 12, 2015.

Updated: October 12, 2015.

Updated: October 12, 2015.

Tries scored
The following table shows all U.S. players that have scored two or more tries in their World Cup career, plus all active players who have scored at least one World Cup try.

Note: The U.S. failed to qualify for the 1995 Rugby World Cup.
 Most penalties scored: Mike Hercus, 15 (2003 & 2007)

Single tournament
 Most points in a single tournament: Mike Hercus, 51 (2003)
 Most tries in a single tournament: Kort Schubert, 3 (2003)

Individual tournaments: 1987 to present

1987 Rugby World Cup
Pool 1 games

1991 Rugby World Cup

Pool 1 games

1995 Rugby World Cup

Did not qualify.

The Americas were allotted only two teams for the 1995 tournament.  Canada automatically qualified, by virtue of reaching the quarterfinals of the 1991 tournament.  Only 1 place remained for the Americas qualifying, to be decided by the winner of the home-and-away series between the US and Argentina (the winner of the Americas South bracket) in 1994.  In that series, the US lost their home match 22-28, and also lost their away match 11-16.  With the 2-0 record and 44-33 aggregate score, Argentina secured the final qualifying spot for the Americas.

1999 Rugby World Cup

Pool E games

2003 Rugby World Cup

Mike Hercus was the leading points scorer for the US - and 7th leading scorer among all players - with 51 points (2 tries, 9 penalties, 7 conversions).

2007 Rugby World Cup
Pool A games

2007 Squad:

Forwards: Blake Burdette, Owen Lentz, Mike MacDonald, Matekitonga Moeakiola, Chris Osentowski, Jonathan Vitale, Luke Gross, Mike Mangan, Hayden Mexted, Alec Parker, Mark Aylor, Inaki Basauri, Todd Clever, Fifita Mounga, Louis Stanfill, Henry Bloomfield, Dan Payne

Backs: Chad Erskine, Mike Petri, Mike Hercus (C), Nese Malifa, Philip Eloff, Vahafolau Esikia, Thretton Palamo, Albert Tuipulotu, Paul Emerick, Takudzwa Ngwenya, Salesi Sika, Francois Viljoen, Chris Wyles

Head Coach:
Peter Thorburn

In the 2007 Rugby World Cup, the US joined England, Samoa, South Africa and Tonga in Pool A. The Eagles, ranked 13th in the world standings, lost all 4 games in Pool A, scoring 1 bonus point in the game against Samoa. Coached by New Zealander Peter Thorburn, the Eagles started off with tough match against the defending world champions England, losing 28–10.  The US was then beaten by Tonga 25–15, lost to Samoa 25 – 21, and lost their final match to highly favored South Africa 64 – 15. The Eagles, however, had a major highlight in the South Africa match. After an interception and a pair of passes, Takudzwa Ngwenya sped down the sideline and outran Bryan Habana, arguably the fastest man in world rugby, to score a try that received Try of the Year honors at the 2007 IRB Awards.

2011 Rugby World Cup

Chris Wyles was the USA's leading scorer of the 2011 tournament with 18 points (1 try, 3 penalties, 2 conversions).

Mike Petri, Paul Emerick, and JJ Gagiano each scored 5 points (1 try) for the US.

30 Man Squad:
 Hooker: Chris Biller, Phil Thiel, Brian McClenahan
 Prop: Mike MacDonald, Mate Moeakiola, Shawn Pittman, Eric Fry
 Lock: Hayden Smith, John van der Giessen
 Loose: Todd Clever (c), Louis Stanfill, Nic Johnson, Scott LaValla, Patrick Danahy, JJ Gagiano, Inaki Basauri
 Scrumhalf: Mike Petri, Tim Usasz
 Flyhalf: Roland Suniula, Nese Malifa
 Center: Andrew Suniula, Paul Emerick, Tai Enosa, Junior Sifa
 Wing: Takudzwa Ngwyenya, James Paterson, Kevin Swiryn, Colin Hawley
 Fullback: Chris Wyles, Blaine Scully

The Eagles showed tremendous fight and power in their World Cup opening match against Ireland. The Irish came out strong but the Eagles were stiff in defense.  The Irish suffered from poor goal kicking and were only able to gain a 3–0 lead before finally scoring their first try at the 39' mark to take a 10-0 half-time lead.  The Irish came out more ready to play in the second half but still ran into stiff Eagles defense.  Ultimately the Irish scored two more tries to give a final tally of 22 points.  The Eagles succeeded in frustrating Irish expectations to gain a bonus point with a full strength squad and managed to post 10 points led by an interception try on full-time by Paul Emerick.

The Eagles came into the World Cup with their measuring mark for success as being a win over Russia.  The Eagles did not disappoint.  Russia leaped out to an early 3–0 lead after a penalty goal from inside the 22 set up by a block on a Mike Petri box kick.  The Americans took a 10–3 lead into the half after a break by Andrew Suniula set up a try for Mike Petri.  The kicking duty fell upon Chris Wyles who capitalized on his first kick, a deep strike in poor conditions from the 10 meter line.  Wyles was also successful on a conversion and with his last attempt at goal.  He did, however, miss 3 kicks at goal and a drop goal.  Russia would land once more on the board to snatch a bonus point from the match but fell to the final tally of USA 13–6 Russia.  Both Wyles and Mike MacDonald had amazing matches as McDonald scooped up the man of the match accolades.  The Eagles were absolutely dominant at the lineout winning 7 of Russia's 13 throws and winning all 12 of their own throws.  The win elevated the Eagles back up to 17th in the IRB rankings and dropped Russia one spot to 21st.

For their third match the Eagles trotted out a squad with 14 changes from the one that met Russia, ensuring that each player on the roster received a cap in the tournament.  Australia got on the board early with tries at the 7- and 10-minute marks, but the Eagles answered with a JJ Gagiano try at the 22nd minute that cut the deficit to 10–5.  Australia quickly responded with two more tries to take a 22–5 lead into the half along with clinching a bonus point.  In the second half the Wallabies jumped on the Eagles leading to the final result of 67–5. This was the worst defeat a US team has ever suffered to Australia.

The final match saw the Eagles playing for a 3rd-place finish in Pool C and an automatic qualification into the 2015 Rugby World Cup.  The Eagles faced Italy (the Azzurri) and the scoring began early by the Azzurri, but the Eagles struck back with a Chris Wyles try and conversion to level the match 7-7. The Italians struck quickly with their second try, and scored their third try on the stroke of halftime to lead 20-10 at the half.  Italy focused their second-half efforts on scoring a fourth try and the bonus point.  The US second-half defense held for 25 minutes, but after tremendous pressure by the Italian scrum - which Italy dominated all match - the Azzurri got their fourth try and the bonus point in the 65th minute.  That try and conversion were the only points for the Azzurri in the second half.  The defeat marked the end of the 2011 Rugby World Cup and the 2011 season for the Eagles.

2015 Rugby World Cup
U.S. summer preparations for the World Cup included four matches at the 2015 Pacific Nations Cup plus two additional World Cup warm-up matches. The U.S. earned three wins and three losses over these matches, with wins against Canada (twice) and Japan.

At the World Cup, the U.S. lost its first match against Samoa 16–25. The Eagles suffered from ill discipline, committing 14 penalties (compared to 7 for Samoa); and from poor tackling, with a 79% tackle success rate and 29 missed tackles, (compared to Samoa's 86% tackle rate and 19 missed tackles).

The team entered World Cup play with the highest hopes in years. The pool draw placed the Eagles alongside Japan, a team they had beaten earlier in the summer, Samoa, a team they've played well in the past, and Scotland. Scotland, though a tier 1 nation, had struggled in recent years. The last team was South Africa, a team that lost its first match of the World Cup to Japan.
In their opening match against Samoa, the United States trailed 14–8 at the half, and ultimately fell 25–16, after finding tremendous difficulties at the lineout and in the scrum.

Carrying a tough 0–1 start into the team's second match, the Eagles made history by claiming a first ever halftime lead over a tier 1 nation (13–6), on the back of a strong showing in the scrum. The second half was less kind, as Scotland quickly overcame the deficit and pushed the final score well out of reach: Scotland 39, USA 16.

With a winless campaign becoming a real possibility, the coaching staff chose a roster that drastically differed from the starters in the first two matches. Against South Africa, the Eagles struggled early and were dominated in the scrum, but kept the match close at the break with South Africa holding a 14-point lead. In the second half, the Springboks blew the match open, running the match to 64–0. The defeat is the fifth largest in USA Rugby history and the largest in a World Cup.

Source: World Rugby
Rank is as of the end of the pool stages, and does not include the knockout rounds.

2019 Rugby World Cup

See also
 Davies, Gerald (2004) The History of the Rugby World Cup (Sanctuary Publishing Ltd,
 Farr-Jones, Nick, (2003). Story of the Rugby World Cup, Australian Post Corporation,

References

World Cup
Rugby World Cup by nation